Poet of the Wastes (Sha'er-e Zobale-ha) is a 2005 film by the Iranian director Mohammad Ahmadi. Mohsen Makhmalbaf wrote the script of the film, which starred Leila Hatami, Saber Abar, and Mohammad Eskandari. The film was presented at festivals in Chicago, Montreal, and Busan.

References

Iranian romantic drama films
2005 films